Alice Duer Miller (July 28, 1874 – August 22, 1942) was an American writer whose poetry actively influenced political opinion. Her feminist verses influenced political opinion during the American suffrage movement, and her verse novel The White Cliffs influenced political thought during the U.S.'s entry into World War II. She also wrote novels and screenplays.

Early life
Alice Duer Miller was born in Staten Island, New York on July 28, 1874, into a wealthy and prominent family. She grew up in Weehawken, New Jersey with her parents and two sisters. She was the daughter of James Gore King Duer and Elizabeth Wilson Meads. The family lost their fortune during the Baring Bank failure.

Her mother Elizabeth Wilson Meads was the daughter of Orlando Meads of Albany, New York. Her great-grandfather was William Alexander Duer, president of Columbia College. Her great-great-grandfather was William Duer, an American lawyer, developer, and speculator from New York City. He had served in the Continental Congress and the convention that framed the New York Constitution. In 1778, he signed the United States Articles of Confederation. Her great-great-great-grandfather was William Alexander, who claimed the disputed title of Earl of Stirling and was an American major-general during the American Revolutionary War.

Miller was also a descendant of Senator Rufus King, who was an American lawyer, politician, and diplomat. He was a delegate for Massachusetts to the Continental Congress. He also attended the Constitutional Convention and was one of the signers of the United States Constitution on September 17, 1787.
Alice attended Barnard College in 1895, studying Mathematics and Astronomy and graduating Phi Beta Kappa. She helped to pay for her studies by selling novels and short essays to Harper's and Scribner's magazines. Alice excelled as a student with her award-winning thesis "Dedekind's Theory of the Irrational Number." She and her sister Caroline jointly published a book of poems. Miller remained connected to Barnard throughout her life; she was elected as a Trustee of Barnard College in 1922.

Career
Alice wrote her entire life, but before she was a full-time writer, she taught at a girls school English composition and tutored Barnard College students in mathematics. Miller became known as a campaigner for women's suffrage and was an active member of the Algonquin Round Table and Heterodoxy (group). She published a series of satirical poems in the New York Tribune titled and later republished in the collection, Are Women People? These words became a catchphrase of the suffrage movement. It reads:

"FATHER, what is a Legislature?
A representative body elected by the people of the state.
Are women people?
No, my son, criminals, lunatics and women are not people.
Do legislators legislate for nothing?
Oh, no; they are paid a salary.
By whom?
By the people.
Are women people?
Of course, my son, just as much as men are." She followed this collection with Women Are People! (1917).

As a novelist, she scored her first success with Come Out of the Kitchen in 1916.  The story was made into a play and later the 1948 film Spring in Park Lane. She followed it with a series of other short novels, many of which were staged and (increasingly) made into films.

Her novel in verse Forsaking All Others (1933) about a tragic love affair, and many consider her greatest work. Miller was invited to write for Hollywood in 1921 by Samuel Goldwyn. Many of her stories became motion pictures, such as Are Parents People? (1925), Roberta (1935), and Irene (1940). She also became involved in a number of motion picture screenplays, including Wife vs. Secretary (1936). Her name appears in the very first issue of The New Yorker as an advisory editor. Throughout her life, she wrote successfully for a wide range of genres and produced forty-four books.

The White Cliffs
In 1940, she wrote the verse novel The White Cliffs, about an American girl who coming to London as a tourist, meets and marries a young upper-class Englishman in the period just before World War I. The war begins and he goes to the front. He is killed just before the end of the War, leaving her with a young son. Her son is the heir to the family estate. Despite the pull of her own country and the impoverished condition of the estate, she decides to stay and live the traditional life of a member of the English upper class. The story concludes as World War II commences, and she worries that her son, like his father, will be killed fighting for the country he loves. The poem ends with the lines:

...I am American bred
I have seen much to hate here – much to forgive,
But in a world in which England is finished and dead,
I do not wish to live.

The poem was spectacularly successful on both sides of the Atlantic, selling nearly one million copies – an unheard of number for a book of verse. It was broadcast and recorded by British-American actress Lynn Fontanne (with a symphonic accompaniment), and the story was made into the 1944 film The White Cliffs of Dover.

Personal life
Once she graduated, she married Henry Wise Miller on October 5, 1899, at Grace Church Chapel in New York City. Henry asked Alice to marry him three days after their first meeting. He was a Harvard graduate, born in 1877, the son of Lt. Commander Jacob Miller. 

They moved to Costa Rica, where Henry Miller was gambling on land speculation and rubber cultivation. Henry and Alice had their first son Denning Duer Miller in this time period when they were moving back and forth between New York City and Costa Rica. Their investment failed and the family moved back to New York City and struggled for years financially. Alice served as the primary breadwinner for the first decade of the marriage until Henry became a successful Wall Street stockbroker. 

After a long illness, Alice Duer Miller died in 1942 and was interred at Evergreen Cemetery in Morristown, New Jersey.

Selected works

 Poems (1896)
 Modern Obstacle (1903)
 Less Than Kin (1909)
 The Blue Arch (1910)
 Things (1914)
 The Burglar and the Blizzard: A Christmas Story (1914)
 Are Parents People? (1914)
 Are Women People? a book of rhymes for suffrage times (1915)
 Come Out of the Kitchen (1916)
 Women Are People! (1917)
 The Sturdy Oak (1917), Alice Duer Miller et al.
A composite Novel of American Politics by fourteen American authors 
 Ladies Must Live (1917)
 The Happiest Time of Their Lives (1918)
 Wings in the Night (1918)
 The Charm School (1919)
 The Beauty and the Bolshevist (1920)
 Manslaughter (1921)
 Priceless Pearl (1924)
 The Reluctant Duchess (1925)
 The Springboard (1928)
 Welcome Home (1928)
 Forsaking All Others (1931)
 Gowns by Roberta (1933)
 Come Out of the Pantry (1934)
 The Rising Star (1935)
 And One Was Beautiful (1937)
 The White Cliffs (1940)

Screenwriter, directed by Paul Bern (1922)The Exquisite Sinner, directed by Josef von Sternberg (1926)The Last Waltz, directed by Arthur Robison (Germany, 1927)Rose Marie, directed by W. S. Van Dyke (1936)Wife vs. Secretary, directed by Clarence Brown (1936)And One Was Beautiful, directed by Robert B. Sinclair (1940)Irene, directed by Herbert Wilcox (1940)

Modern works and inspiration
Composer Edna Yeh set selections from Are Women People?'' to music. The work was commissioned and performed by Voci Women's Vocal Ensemble.

References

External links

 
 
 
Site dedicated to Alice Duer Miller's poems

1874 births
1942 deaths
Barnard College alumni
Burials at Evergreen Cemetery (Morristown, New Jersey)
American women poets
The New Yorker people
American people of Dutch descent
American people of English descent
American people of Scottish descent
De Peyster family
Livingston family
Schuyler family
Algonquin Round Table
People from Weehawken, New Jersey